Calumet is a neighborhood in northern Lexington, Kentucky, United States. Its boundaries are Viley Road to the west, Versailles Road to the south, New Circle Road to the north, and Wolf Run Creek to the east.

Neighborhood statistics
 Area: 
 Population: 750
 Population density: 2,822 people per square mile (1,087/km2)
 Median household income: $49,446

References

Neighborhoods in Lexington, Kentucky